William Henry Anderson (November 21, 1908 – November 13, 1997) was an American entomologist.

Biography
Anderson was born in 1908. He was educated at the University of Maryland, in which he also got his Ph.D. in 1936. During the same year he became a member of the United States Department of Agriculture, his job was there as a field assistant, and at the same time he worked with the Bureau of Entomology and Plant Quarantine. In 1937 he received a promotion as an assistant entomologist, and in 1939 he became the entomologist himself. He was appointed as Chief of Insect Identification and Parasite Introduction Research Branch in 1960, which position he kept till he retired in 1967. He was a specialist on the Coleoptera and its larvae.

References

American entomologists
1908 births
1997 deaths
People from Chesterfield, Massachusetts
University of Maryland, College Park alumni
20th-century American zoologists